A Night in the Netherhells is a novel by Craig Shaw Gardner published by Ace Books in 1987.

Plot summary
A Night in the Netherhells is the third book in the series about the wizard Ebenezum, whose allergy to magic prevents him from using it.

Reception
Lynn Bryant reviewed A Night in the Netherhells in Space Gamer/Fantasy Gamer No. 79. Bryant commented that "It is an amusing romp, in which it is demonstrated that the Netherhells isn't such a bad place to call home (if you're a demon), and that progress cheapens the good things in life. Good tongue in cheek fantasy."

References

1987 American novels
1987 fantasy novels